Gabas may refer to:

Gabas (river), a tributary of the Adour in south-west France
Gabas, Pyrénées-Atlantiques, a hamlet in south-west France
Pablo Antonio Gabas (born 1982), Argentine footballer

See also 
 Boneh-ye Abbas, Khuzestan, also known as Gabbas, a village in Iran